Hartmut Schick (born 16 October 1960) is a German musicologist and since 2001 professor at the Institute for Musicology of the Ludwig Maximilian University of Munich.

Life 
Born in Herrenberg, Schick grew up mainly in Schwäbisch Hall, and from 1981 studied 16 semesters musicology, history and philosophy at the University of Tübingen, and from 1983 under Ludwig Finscher in Heidelberg. In 1989, he was awarded a doctorate for a thesis entitled Studien zu Dvoráks Streichquartetten.

From 1989 to 1996, he worked as a research assistant in Tübingen (1996 habilitation with the study Musikalische Einheit im italienischen Madrigal von Rore bis Monteverdi).

In 1998 he became a university lecturer in Tübingen, but in 1999 and 2000 he moved to Munich, where he succeeded Theodor Göllner.

Since 2011, Schick has been project manager of the "Kritischen Ausgabe der Werke von Richard Strauss" and head of the Richard Strauss Complete Edition Research Unit at the LMU Munich.

References

External links 
 Website LMU

Academic staff of the University of Tübingen
Academic staff of the Ludwig Maximilian University of Munich
20th-century German musicologists
21st-century German musicologists
1960 births
Living people
People from Herrenberg